Malakai Yasa Kaunaivalu is a Fijian former professional rugby league footballer who represented Fiji at the 1995 World Cup. He started in all three of Fiji's matches at the tournament.

Following this tournament he signed with the Sheffield Eagles along with teammates Waisale Sovatabua and Joe Dakuitoga. Kaunaivalu spent two seasons at the Eagles. He played for Fiji against Australia during the Super League war. He later played one more test match for Fiji, against Great Britain in 1996.

References

Living people
Fijian rugby league players
Fiji national rugby league team players
Rugby league props
1969 births
Sportspeople from Lautoka
Sheffield Eagles (1984) players
Place of birth missing (living people)
Fijian expatriate rugby league players
Expatriate rugby league players in England
Fijian expatriate sportspeople in England
I-Taukei Fijian people